Chan Wui-ngai, (born 6 February 1953; often credited as Billy Chan) is a Hong Kong actor, stuntman, director, fight choreographer, and film producer.

Chan won the 1983 Hong Kong Film Award for Best Action Choreography along with Sammo Hung, Lam Ching-ying and Xia Ling-zhen (Yuen Biao) for his work in The Prodigal Son. In later years, Chan won several more choreography awards.

Biography 
Chan was born on 6 February 1953, in Hong Kong with his brother Chan Lung. At the age of 7, he attended the Nah-Hwa Primary School on Hong Kong Island, where he failed his first year, after which his parents withdrew him from the school.

In his teenage years, he was sent to the China Drama Academy, a Peking opera School run by  Yu Jim-yuen. Despite being an actor, Chan also trained martial arts. Chan trained rigorously for the next decade, excelling in martial arts and acrobatics. He later left the Peking Opera School.

Later, he attended directing and producing school. Chan start directing martial arts movies. He studied martial arts under Bruce Lee and appeared in several films with Lee, including The Big Boss, Fist of Fury and Enter the Dragon.

Film career 
Beginning in 1986, Chan directed 15 movies, beginning with New Mr. Vampire, which won several directing awards. He next directed the film Brotherhood, which starred Ko Chun-hsiung and Chow Yun-fat.

References

1953 births
Living people
Hong Kong male actors